Vanistan (also Romanized as Vanīstān; also known as Vanīstān-e Chūbar) is a village in Chubar Rural District, Haviq District, Talesh County, Gilan Province, Iran. At the 2006 census, its population was 70, in 17 families.

References 

Populated places in Talesh County